The Lake County Sheriff's Office is the largest law enforcement agency in Lake County, Florida, United States. Per the State of Florida Constitution, the sheriff is the chief law enforcement officer of both the incorporated and unincorporated areas of the county. The current Sheriff is Peyton C. Grinnell who was elected November, 2016 in the Lake County general election.  He succeeds Sheriff Gary Borders (d. Nov. 2021), who was appointed by Governor Jeb Bush  following the death of Sheriff Chris Daniels in 2006, and was subsequently elected in 2008, and 2012.  The agency has been awarded with a certificate of accreditation from the Commission for Florida Law Enforcement Accreditation, consequently, both the Law Enforcement and Corrections divisions of the Lake County Sheriff's Office are now accredited.

Divisions

Law Enforcement Operations
Uniform Patrol Bureau (Road Patrol, Traffic Enforcement, Street Crimes Unit, Report Writers)
Criminal Investigations Bureau (Property Crimes, Missing Persons, Economic Crimes, Violent Crimes, Special Victims Unit, Crime Scene Investigations, Evidence, Fingerprints)
Special Investigations Bureau (Intelligence Unit, Sexual Offender Tracking Unit, Narcotics Unit, Homeland Security Unit, Cyber Crimes Unit, Felony Registration)
Criminal Justice Operations
Court Services Bureau (Court Deputies, Bailiff Unit, Building Security)
Detention Security Bureau (Detention Deputies, Building Security)
Support Services Bureau (Booking, Classification, Fugitive Extradition, Transportation)
'''Administrative Services
Emergency Management Bureau (Ag/Marine, Animal Enforcement Officers, Aviation, Emergency Management)
Special Services Bureau (9-1-1 Communications, Information Technology, School Resource Deputies, Radio/Electronics Shop, Juvenile Court Liaison, Criminal Justice Academy, Explorer Post 60, School Crossing Guards, Citizens On Patrol, Community Services)
Support Services Bureau (Civil Deputies, Property Section, Warrants, Fleet Maintenance, Records)

Specialty units

Like many law enforcement agencies, the Lake County Sheriff's Office also has deputies with specialized training.  These deputies perform their normal full-time jobs (road patrol, detectives, detention deputy, etc.) and perform one the specialty units as the needs call for.
Some of the specialty units are:
Aviation Unit
Dive Team (Underwater Search and Recovery)
HDT (Hazardous Devices Team)
Honor Guard
Hostage Negotiations Team
K9 Unit
Marine Unit
Mounted Patrol and Posse
SWAT
Street Crimes Unit
Traffic Enforcement Unit (Motors Unit)

Previous Sheriffs (1887-2016) 

 Sheriff B.A. Cassidy also served as interim Sheriff from 1908-1909
 Sheriff John P. Galloway also Served as Sheriff of Sumter County, Florida and later Marion County, Florida

Misconduct

In January 2011, Lieutenant C.J. Thompson bought a laptop computer with a department credit card. He then repaid the amount due from investigative funds. He resigned when he was caught.
 
In July 2012, unnamed deputies were seeking a man suspected of murder. They went to the wrong apartment door at night and were met by an armed occupant who came out armed and was shot and killed. Drugs and Paraphernalia were found in the apartment.  The deputies said they had not announced themselves as police as required by procedures.
 
In January 2014, Deputy Matthew Donnelly was arrested for the sexual battery of a woman after placing her boyfriend in handcuffs in the back of his police car. A police spokesman said DNA evidence pointed to Donnelly. The officer was fired shortly after his arrest., Donnelly was sentenced to 12 years in state prison.

See also

List of law enforcement agencies in Florida
List of U.S. state and local law enforcement agencies
Sheriff (Florida)
Willis V. McCall Sheriff of Lake County 1944-1972

References

External links
 Lake County Sheriff's Office (official site)
 The Officer Down Memorial Page
 

Lake County, Florida
Sheriffs' departments of Florida